Collins is an unincorporated community and census-designated place (CDP) in Drew County, Arkansas, United States. It was first listed as a CDP in the 2020 census with a population of 149.

Demographics

2020 census

Note: the US Census treats Hispanic/Latino as an ethnic category. This table excludes Latinos from the racial categories and assigns them to a separate category. Hispanics/Latinos can be of any race.

Education
Collins is in the Dermott School District, which operates Dermott High School.

Collins previously had its own school district. In 1979 the Collins school district dissolved, with portions of the students going to the Dermott school district.

References 

Census-designated places in Drew County, Arkansas
Census-designated places in Arkansas